Hernando de Magallanes is an underground metro station on the Line 1 of the Santiago Metro, in Santiago, Chile. The station entrance kiosk is on Monsignor Manuel Larraín Square, which was altered due to the construction of the station.

The station was opened on 7 January 2010 as part of the extension of the line from Escuela Militar to Los Dominicos,

References

Santiago Metro stations
Railway stations opened in 2010
2010 establishments in Chile
Santiago Metro Line 1